Fiplingvatnet may refer to the following lakes in Grane, Nordland county, Norway:

 Nedre Fiplingvatnet
 Øvre Fiplingvatnet